Gianluca is an Italian masculine given name. Its English translation is "John Luke" and it is often a shorter form of "Giovanni Luca".

Gianluca Alfenoni (born 1996), Argentine footballer 
Gianluca Arrighi (born 1972), Italian writer
Gianluca Attanasio (born 1979), Italian singer-songwriter, composer, and film director
Gianluca Atzori (born 1971), Italian footballer and manager
Gianluca Bacchiocchi (born 1987), Italian footballer
Gianluca Barattolo (born 1978), Italian rowing coxswain
Gianluca Barba (born 1995), Italian footballer 
Gianluca Barilari (born 1964), Swiss basketball coach
Gianluca Basile (born 1975), Italian basketball player
Gianluca Berti (born 1967), Italian footballer
Gianluca Bezzina (born 1989), Maltese singer and doctor, also known by the mononym Gianluca
Gianluca Bocchi (born 1954), Italian philosopher
Gianluca Bollini (born 1980), Sammarinese footballer
Gianluca Bortolami (born 1968), Italian road cyclist
Gianluca Brambilla (born 1987), Italian road bicycle racer
Gianluca Branco (born 1970), Italian boxer 
Gianluca Buonanno (1966–2016), Italian politician
Gianluca Busato (born 1969), Italian entrepreneur, engineer, activist, and politician
Gianluca Busio (born 2002), American soccer player
Gianluca Caprari (born 1993), Italian footballer 
Gianluca Carpani (born 1993), Italian footballer 
Gianluca Cascioli (born 1979), Italian pianist, conductor, and composer
Gianluca Castellini (fl. 15th-century), Italian Roman Catholic prelate and bishop
Gianluca Catalano (born 2000), Canadian soccer player
Gianluca Cherubini (born 1974), Italian footballer 
Gianluca Cologna (born 1990), Swiss cross-country skier
Gianluca Comotto (born 1978), Italian footballer
Gianluca Conte (born 1972), Italian footballer, manager, and analyzer 
Gianluca Costantini (born 1971), Italian cartoonist, artist, and activist
Gianluca Crisafi (born 1974), Italian voice actor
Gianluca Cuomo (born 1993), American soccer player
Gianluca Curci (born 1985), Italian footballer
Gianluca D'Angelo (born 1991), Swiss footballer
Gianluca De Angelis (born 1967), Italian footballer
Gianluca De Angelis (born 1981), Italian footballer
Gianluca de Lorenzi (born 1972), Italian auto racing driver and team owner
Gianluca De Ponti (born 1952), Italian footballer
Gianluca Di Chiara (born 1993), Italian footballer 
Gianluca Di Gennaro (born 1987), Italian footballer
Gianluca Di Giulio (born 1972), Italian footballer 
Gianluca Faliva (born 1973), Italian rugby player
Gianluca Falsini (born 1975) Italian footballer and manager 
Gianluca Farina (born 1962), Italian rower
Gianluca Ferrari (born 1997), Argentine footballer 
Gianluca Festa (born 1959), Italian footballer
Gianluca Festa (born 1974), Italian politician.
Gianluca Firmo (Born 1973), Italian singer and musician
Gianluca Floris (born 1964), Italian writer and belcanto singer
Gianluca Forcolin (born 1968), Italian politician
Gianluca Frabotta (born 1999), Italian footballer 
Gianluca Francesconi (born 1971), Italian footballer
Gianluca Franciosi (born 1991), Italian footballer 
Gianluca Frontino (born 1989), Swiss footballer
Gianluca Freddi (born 1989), Italian footballer 
Gianluca Gaetano (born 2000), Italian footballer
Gianluca Galasso (born 1984), Italian footballer
Gianluca Galimberti (born 1968), Italian professor and politician
Gianluca Gaudenzi (born 1965), Italian footballer and coach
Gianluca Gaudino (born 1996), German footballer
Gianluca Ginoble (born 1995), Italian baritone of the boyband Il Volo
Gianluca Giovannini (born 1983), Italian footballer
Gianluca Gorini (born 1970), Italian racing cyclist
Gianluca Gracco (born 1990), Italian footballer
Gianluca Grassadonia (born 1972), Italian footballer and coach
Gianluca Grava (born 1977), Italian footballer
Gianluca Grignani (born 1972), Italian singer
Gianluca Guidi (born 1968), Italian rugby player and coach
Gianluca Havern (born 1988), English footballer
Gianluca Hossmann (born 1991), Swiss footballer 
Gianluca Iacono (born 1970), Italian voice actor
Gian-Luca Itter (born 1999), German footballer
Gianluca Korte (born 1990), German footballer
Gianluca Lapadula (born 1990), Italian footballer
Gianluca Litteri (born 1988), Italian footballer 
Gianluca Luisi (born 1970), Italian pianist
Gianluca Luppi (born 1966), Italian footballer and coach
Gianluca Mager (born 1994), Italian tennis player
Gianluca Maggiore (born 1985), Italian racing cyclist
Gianluca Maglia (born 1988), Italian swimmer
Gianluca Mancini (born 1996), Italian footballer 
Gianluca Mancuso (born 1998), Argentine footballer
Gianluca Marchetti (born 1993), Italian basketball player
Gianluca Maria (born 1992), Curaçaoan footballer
Gianluca Marzullo (born 1991), Italian footballer
Gianluca Masi (born 1972), Italian astrophysicist and astronomer
Gianluca Musacci (born 1987), Italian footballer
Gianluca Nani (born 1962), Italian football director
Gianluca Naso (born 1987), Italian tennis player
Gianluca Nicco (born 1988), Italian footballer
Gianluca Nijholt (born 1990), Dutch professional footballer
Gianluca Pagliuca (born 1966), Italian footballer and coach
Gianluca Pandeynuwu (born 1997), Indonesian footballer
Gianluca Paparesta (born 1969), Italian football referee
Gianluca Pegolo (born 1981), Italian footballer
Gianluca Pessotto (born 1970), Italian footballer
Gianluca Petrachi (born 1969), Italian footballer
Gianluca Petrella (born 1975), Italian jazz trombonist
Gianluca Pianegonda (born 1968), Italian racing cyclist
Gianluca Piccoli (born 1997), Italian footballer
Gianluca Pierobon (born 1967), Italian racing cyclist
Gianluca Pollace (born 1995), Italian football player
Gianluca Pozzi (born 1965), Italian tennis player
Gianluca Pugliese (born 1997), Argentine footballer
Gianluca Ramazzotti (born 1970), Italian actor 
Gianluca Rinaldini (born 1959), Italian tennis player 
Gianluca Rocchi (born 1973), Italian football referee
Gianluca Sampietro (born1993), Italian footballer
Gianluca Sansone (born 1987), Italian footballer 
Gianluca Savoldi (born 1975), Italian footballer
Gianluca Scamacca (born 1999), Italian footballer
Gianluca Segarelli (born 1978), Italian footballer
Gianluca Signorini (1960–2002), Italian footballer
Gianluca Simeone (born 1998), Argentine footballer 
Gianluca Sironi (born 1974), Italian cyclist
Gianluca Sordo (born 1969), Italian footballer 
Gianluca Spinelli (born 1966), Italian football goalkeeper coach
Gianluca Susta (born 1956), Italian politician
Gianluca Maria Tavarelli (born 1964), Italian film director and screenwriter
Gianluca Temelin (born 1976), Italian footballer 
Gianluca Testa (born 1982), Italian actor and director
Gianluca Tiberti (born 1967), Italian modern pentathlete
Gianluca Tognon (born 1976), Italian food scientist, researcher, public health expert, and speaker
Gianluca Toscano (born 1984), Italian footballer
Gianluca Triuzzi (born 1978), Italian footballer
Gianluca Turchetta (born 1991), Italian footballer 
Gianluca Valoti (born 1973), Italian road racing cyclist 
Gianluca Vialli (1964–2023), Italian footballer
Gianluca Vivan (born 1983), Italian footballer
Gianluca Vizziello (born 1980), Italian motorcycle racer
Gianluca Zambrotta (born 1977), Italian footballer
Gianluca Zanetti (born 1977), Italian footballer
Gianluca Zavarise (born 1986), Canadian soccer player

See also
Giovanni (name)
Luca (given name)

Italian masculine given names